This is a list of schools in India grouped by state/UT. Where a state or city has its own list, it is linked without duplicating the names here.There are more than 1.5 million schools in India, so we only list those with Wikipedia articles.

Andhra Pradesh

Anantapur

Guntur

East Godavari

Krishna

Nellore

Vishakapatnam

West Godavari

Other locations

Arunachal Pradesh

Assam

Guwahati

Bihar

Bettiah

Bhagalpur

Patna

Other locations

Chandigarh

Chhattisgarh

Delhi

Goa

Gujarat

Ahmedabad

Rajkot

Vadodara

Surat

Other locations

Haryana

Faridabad

Gurgaon

Other locations

Himachal Pradesh

Jammu and Kashmir

Jharkhand

Bokaro

Dhanbad

Jamshedpur

Ranchi

Other

Karnataka

Bangalore

Other locations

Kerala

Madhya Pradesh

Maharashtra

Manipur

Meghalaya 

 Christian Girls' Higher Secondary School, Tura
 Don Bosco Technical School, Shillong
 St. Anthony's Higher Secondary School, Shillong

Mizoram

Nagaland

Odisha

Pondicherry

Punjab

Rajasthan

Sikkim

 Taktse International School
 Tashi Namgyal Academy

Tamil Nadu

Telangana

Hyderabad

Warangal

Other locations

Tripura

Uttar Pradesh

Allahabad

Faizabad

Ghaziabad

Kanpur

Kanpur Dehat

Lucknow

Meerut

Noida

Other locations

Uttarakhand

West Bengal

National chains

See also 

 Education in India
 List of boarding schools in India
 List of international schools in India
 List of Jesuit secondary schools in India

References